Old Eighteen may refer to:

 The first class of eighteen officer cadets of the Royal Military College of Canada
 Eighteen Texians who instigated the battle of Battle of Gonzales